Sorrento is an unincorporated community and census-designated place in Lake County, Florida, United States. The population was 861 at the 2010 census, up from 765 at the 2000 census. It is part of the Orlando–Kissimmee Metropolitan Statistical Area.

Geography
Sorrento is located in eastern Lake County and is bordered to the east by Mount Plymouth. Florida State Road 46 passes through Sorrento, leading west  to Mount Dora and east  to Sanford.

It is part of the Wekiva River watershed.

Demographics

As of the census of 2000, there were 765 people, 269 households, and 203 families residing in the CDP. The racial makeup of the CDP was 89.54% White, 0.78% African American, 0.78% Native American, 6.80% from other races, and 2.09% from two or more races. Hispanic or Latino of any race were 17.39% of the population.

There were 269 households, out of which 36.8% had children under the age of 18 living with them, 57.6% were married couples living together, 11.2% had a female householder with no husband present, and 24.5% were non-families. 18.6% of all households were made up of individuals, and 6.3% had someone living alone who was 65 years of age or older.  The average household size was 2.84 and the average family size was 3.23.

In the CDP, the population was spread out, with 28.6% under the age of 18, 8.9% from 18 to 24, 32.4% from 25 to 44, 20.4% from 45 to 64, and 9.7% who were 65 years of age or older.  The median age was 35 years. For every 100 females, there were 104.5 males.  For every 100 females age 18 and over, there were 103.0 males.

The median income for a household in the CDP was $39,318, and the median income for a family was $41,343. Males had a median income of $25,845 versus $17,101 for females. The per capita income for the CDP was $17,569.  None of the families and 2.2% of the population were living below the poverty line, including no under eighteens and 15.1% of those over 64.

References

Census-designated places in Lake County, Florida
Greater Orlando
Census-designated places in Florida